Bala Afrakoti (also Romanized as Bālā Afrākotī) is a village in Bisheh Sar Rural District, in the Central District of Qaem Shahr County, Mazandaran Province, Iran. At the 2006 census, its population was 881, in 237 families.

References 

Populated places in Qaem Shahr County